Re Halt Garage (1964) Ltd [1982] 3 All ER 1016 is a UK company law case concerning reduction of capital and executive pay. It held that money can be ordered to be returned if a sum paid to a director is in substance a reduction of capital, because the amounts cannot seriously be regarded as remuneration.

The proper procedure for reduction of capital is now found in Companies Act 2006, sections 641-653.

Facts
Mr and Mrs Charlesworth started Halt Garage (1964) Ltd. After Mrs Charlesworth became ill, the business declined, from £106,000 turnover in 1967 to voluntary liquidation in 1971. From 1968 to 1971 Mr Charlesworth worked full time and got £3500 as a director, while Mrs Charlesworth did not work due to her illness but was still paid £500 to £1500. The liquidator claimed this represented an illegal reduction of capital.

Judgment
Oliver J said that creditors are entitled to assume that what is paid as remuneration is so in substance, and not a disguised distribution to shareholders. Here it was a genuine payment of remuneration to Mr Charlesworth. For Mrs Charlesworth, the facts were more problematic. There was nothing as a matter of construction to prevent someone being paid during absences for illness, but although it was irrelevant that she was paid when the company was unprofitable, it appeared that some of the sums could not really be considered remuneration and she would have to restore the excessive sums. Those were not "a genuine award of remuneration" but rather a "disguised gift out of capital".

See also
 UK company law
 Bednash v Hearsey [2001] EWCA Civ 787

Notes

United Kingdom company case law
High Court of Justice cases
1982 in case law
1982 in British law